Alexander Y. Tetelbaum (born 1948 in Kiev, Ukrainian SSR) is an educator, inventor, scientist, academician, and entrepreneur. He has been a pioneer in the Electronic Design Automation (EDA) and Artificial Intelligence (AI) industries since the 1960s. He has been selected and has held high level positions in academia and industry. He is a Fellow and Honorary Doctor of several universities, academies, and societies. He holds more than 40 US patents  and is the author and co-author of 300 publications, including 16 books. Last published book:  "Minimum Number of Timing Signoff Corners" )

Education and career
He holds Doctor of Engineering Science (Grand PhD) degree in Computer Science and Engineering as well as PhD in Electrical and Computer Engineering. Tetelbaum was Professor of Design Automation and a Distinguished Scientist at the National Technical University of Ukraine. In 1991, he founded and presided over the International Solomon University. He has served as a reviewer for the American Mathematical Society since 1994. Dr. Tetelbaum led design methodology and automation teams in LSI Corporation, Silicon Graphics (SGI), and Zycad Corporations. Currently, he is President and CEO of Abelite Design Automation, Inc.

Alexander Tetelbaum was selected for inclusion in Who's Who in the World, Men of Achievement, Who's Who in Technology, Who's Who in American Education, 5000 Personalities of the World, Who's Who in Science and Engineering, The International Directory of Distinguished Leadership, Longman Reference on Research Directories. WorldAtlas.com has included Dr. Tetelbaum as a Ukrainian famous inventor and scientist who “has made a significant contribution to the country in his personal endeavors”. The Star (ID: HD92636) residing at the astronomically verified position of constellation Leo (Right Ascension: 10h41m55.30s, Declination: +08.24.52.0) is hereby named as “Dr. Alexander Tetelbaum”. His hobbies include oil painting, table tennis, chess, solving and developing puzzles (books: "Yes-No Puzzles & Games",, "Puzzle Games For Kids", "Solving Non-Standard Problems"), "Solving Non-Standard Very Hard Problems" ) in non-standard thinking and critical problem-solving.

Note: Doctor of Science is a "higher doctorate" awarded in recognition of a national/international substantial and sustained contribution to scientific knowledge beyond that required for a PhD.

References

External links 
HISTORY OF FOUNDATION, OUTSTANDING PERSONALITIES OF ISU

1948 births
Living people
Engineers from Kyiv
Artificial intelligence researchers
Logic programming researchers
20th-century American mathematicians
21st-century American mathematicians
20th-century Ukrainian Jews
American computer scientists
Jewish American scientists
Electronic design automation people
American electronics engineers
Silicon Valley people
Soviet emigrants to the United States
Russian inventors
21st-century American Jews
20th-century Ukrainian engineers
Ukrainian computer scientists